The Yana-Indigirka Lowland is a large, low alluvial plain located in northern Siberia, Far Eastern Federal District, Russia.

Administratively most of the territory  of the lowland is part of the Sakha Republic (Yakutia). There are inhabited centers of population in the lowlands such as Chokurdakh, Olenegorsk and Nizhneyansk, but these are very few and scattered.

Geography
The lowland is named after the Yana River in the west and the Indigirka River in the east and is crossed by both rivers in their middle and lower courses. It is limited by the Kyundyulyun, the northern end of the Selennyakh Range and the Polousny Range in the south.

The Yana-Indigirka Lowland also includes the lower course of the Omoloy River at the western end, the vast delta of river Yana, as well as the Byoryolyokh and Allaikha lower course tributaries of the Indigirka in the east. Other important rivers of the lowland are the Chondon, with its tributaries Nuchcha and Buor-Yuryakh, the San-Yuryakh, Sellyakh, Muksunuokha, Kyuyol-Yuryakh, Khroma —with the Uryung-Ulakh, the Sundrun, Dyagarin, Bogdashkina and Gusinaya, among other smaller rivers and streams.

The Yana-Indigirka Lowland is part of the wider Yana-Kolyma system of lowlands, which includes the Aby Lowland to the south of the Polousny Range and the Kolyma Lowland in the eastern side.

Soil
The lowlands have a thermokarst ground, composed of various kinds of marine, river and lake sediments with a high content of fossil ice owing to the prevalence of permafrost. The features of the local relief include alas depressions with lakes and swamps, as well as polygonal soils. Along the banks of rivers, seas and lakes there are baydzharakh mounds.

Climate
The climate of the lowland is severe, with long, bitter winters. The vast plain is wholly frozen, under ice and snow, between early October and the end of May or early June, according to the year. Once the ice melts large areas become flooded and some islands and sandbanks completely disappear underwater. After the floods dwindle a period of summer/early autumn low water begins until the winter frost sets in.

Flora and fauna
At the northern limits, above the 69th parallel, the lowland seashores are covered with moss, lichen and shrub tundra. In the southern part there are forest tundra zones, especially along river valleys, the forest cover consisting of thinly scattered larch.

There are reindeer herds in the Yana-Indigirka Lowland, as well as wolves and arctic fox, among other animals. the waters of rivers and lakes are rich in various species of fish, such as Siberian vendace, chir, muksun, nelma and omul.

See also
Baydzharakh
Reindeer in Russia
Northeast Siberian coastal tundra

References

External links
Wetlands in Russia - Vol.4

East Siberian Lowland